Millington Wildlife Management Area is a 4,000-acre Wildlife Management Area in Kent County, Maryland. The area is ecologically diverse, featuring hardwood forests as well as various types of wetlands, fields, and meadows. Millington supports a large variety of wildlife, including, whitetail deer, turkeys, quail, rabbits, and waterfowl, as well as protecting a number of endangered plants and animals species. The site also provides outdoor recreation as well as hunting in all established seasons.

References

External links
 Millington Wildlife Management Area

Wildlife management areas of Maryland
Protected areas of Kent County, Maryland